Elachista calusella is a moth of the family Elachistidae. It is found in the United States, where it has been recorded from Florida.

References

calusella
Moths described in 1996
Moths of North America